Megget Water is a river in the parish of Yarrow, Selkirkshire in the Scottish Borders area of Scotland. The Water rises at Broad Law (2,760 ft), passes through Megget Reservoir and empties into St Mary's Loch. Places in the vicinity include Cappercleuch, Craigierig, Cramalt Tower, the Glengaber Burn, Meggethead Farm.

The Megget area, formerly a parish united with Lyne, Scottish Borders,  is of geological and archaeological interest, through stone artifacts at Henderland in the lower Megget valley (now in Wilton Lodge Museum, Hawick), and discoveries of gold.

See also
Rivers of Scotland
List of places in the Scottish Borders
List of places in Scotland

References
 NMS (1992d), 'Megget Water (Yarrow parish):cup-marked stone', Discovery Excav Scot, page 7
 Scottish Journal of Geology (The Geological Society): R.J.Chapman, R.C.Leake, J.D,Floyd:  Regional variation in gold mineralization in the vicinity of the Glengaber Burn, Scottish Borders
 Proc Soc Antiq Scot, III, 1981, 401-429, Cramalt Tower:historical survey and excavations 1977–9, Alastair M T Maxwell-Irving

External links
RCAHMS record of Henderland, Megget Water
CANMORE/RCAHMS record of Boar Cleuch Flow, Megget Water
CANMORE/RCAHMS record of Glengaber Burn, Gold Workings
Cramalt tower:historical survey and excavations 1977-9
Ancient Stones: The Megget Stone, near Cappercleuch
Vision of Britain, Gazetteer entries for Peebles Shire

Rivers of the Scottish Borders
3Megget